Elena Likhovtseva and Elena Vesnina were the defending champions, but Likhovtseva chose not to participate, and only Vesnina competed that year.
Vesnina partnered with Maria Kirilenko, but they were forced to withdraw before their first round match, due to a left knee injury for Kirilenko.

Anabel Medina Garrigues and Virginia Ruano Pascual won in the final 6–2, 6–4, against Eleni Daniilidou and Jasmin Wöhr.

Seeds

Draw

Draw

External links
 Draw

Doubles
Moorilla Hobart International